Barbara Anita Blackmon (nee Martin, born December 7, 1955) is an American politician who has served in the Mississippi State Senate from the 21st district since 2016. She previously served in the Mississippi State Senate from 1992 to 2004.

References

1955 births
Living people
Democratic Party Mississippi state senators
African-American state legislators in Mississippi
African-American women in politics
21st-century American women politicians
21st-century American politicians
21st-century African-American women
21st-century African-American politicians
20th-century African-American people
20th-century African-American women